{{DISPLAYTITLE:O6-Benzylguanine}}

O6-Benzylguanine (O6-BG) is a synthetic derivative of guanine.  It is an antineoplastic agent.  It exerts its effect by acting as a suicide inhibitor of the enzyme O6-alkylguanine-DNA alkyltransferase which leads to interruption of DNA repair. O6-BG was used clinically in combination with the alkylating agent temozolomide for glioblastoma, however the combination was found to be overly toxic without adding significant benefit.

O6-BG is also used as a biochemical tool in the study of DNA repair mechanisms.

References

External links
 

Purines
Antineoplastic drugs
Experimental cancer drugs
Benzyl compounds